Sant'Ilario d'Enza is a comune (municipality) in the Province of Reggio Emilia in the Italian region Emilia-Romagna, located about  northwest of Bologna and about  northwest of Reggio Emilia.

Sant'Ilario d'Enza borders the following municipalities: Campegine, Gattatico, Montecchio Emilia, Montechiarugolo, Parma, Reggio Emilia.

Twin towns
Sant'Ilario d'Enza is twinned with:

  Melissa, Calabria, Italy
  Zierenberg, Germany

References

External links
 Official website

Cities and towns in Emilia-Romagna